HD 88522 is a double or multiple star. The component stars are two white stars of similar spectral type—A1V and A2V—and luminosity.

References

A-type main-sequence stars
Binary stars
Antlia
Durchmusterung objects
088522
049967
4003